The 2011 European Team Championships Super League was the Super League of the 3rd edition of the European Team Championships (European Athletics Team Championships from 2013 edition), the 2011 European Team Championships, which took place on 18 and 19 June 2011 in Stockholm, Sweden. As with the previous championships there were a couple of rules applying specifically to this competition, such as the limit of three attempts in the throwing events, long jump and triple jump (only the top four were allowed the fourth attempt) and the limit of four misses total in the high jump and pole vault.

Final standings

Original standings

Note: After the results of several athletes banned for doping were retroactively voided, points had to be reallocated. This resulted in the originally relegated Czech Republic being one place higher than Belarus.

Updated standings

Men

100 metres 
Wind:Heat 1: -0.6 m/sHeat 2: +1.0 m/s

200 metres 
Wind:Heat 1: -1.8 m/sHeat 2: -2.8 m/s

400 metres

800 metres

1500 metres

3000 metres

5000 metres

3000 metres steeplechase

110 metres hurdles

400 metres hurdles

4 × 100 metres relay

4 × 400 metres relay

High jump

Pole vault

Long jump

Triple jump

Shot put

Discus throw

Hammer throw

Javelin throw

Women

100 metres 
Wind:Heat 1: −0.5 m/sHeat 2: +1.5 m/s

200 metres

400 metres

800 metres

1500 metres

3000 metres

5000 metres

3000 metres steeplechase

100 metres hurdles

400 metres hurdles

4 × 100 metres relay

4 × 400 metres relay

High jump

Pole vault

Long jump

Triple jump

Shot put

Discus throw

Hammer throw

Javelin throw

Score table

References

Ecternal links
 Results

European Athletics Team Championships Super League
European
2011 in Swedish sport
International athletics competitions hosted by Sweden
International sports competitions in Stockholm
2010s in Stockholm